Solo: Songs and Collaborations 1982–2015 is a compilation album by Tracey Thorn, released in the UK on 23 October 2015. It features 34 tracks spanning her career as a solo artist and includes collaborations with other artists, including The Unbending Trees ("Overture"), Massive Attack ("Protection") and The Style Council ("The Paris Match"). Further collaborations include tracks with Robert Wyatt and Hot Chip. The tracks are arranged over two discs. It is also available as a digital album, and as a shortened single-disc compilation.

Background
Solo: Songs and Collaborations 1982 - 2015 includes tracks from Thorn's four solo albums: A Distant Shore (1982), Out of the Woods (2007), Love and Its Opposite (2010) and Tinsel and Lights (2012). In addition there are also songs that featured on the 2015 film soundtrack "The Falling".

Thorn announced details of her new album at the beginning of October 2015, saying "These tracks represent, on one hand, the moments when I was working as a solo artist outside the constraints and democracy of a band, either recording tracks entirely by myself, or at least being in the driving seat, the one making all the artistic decisions. And on the other hand, those times when I guested with other bands or producers, performing as a featured solo singer, moonlighting from my regular job."

Tracey Thorn enjoyed her greatest commercial success as one half of the duo Everything But The Girl, which she formed with her partner (now husband), Ben Watt. In 1994 their single "Missing" sold 870,000 copies in the UK and is credited as the highest selling single in the UK not to reach the top 2 (it peaked at number 3 in 1994). Prior to Everything But The Girl, Thorn was a member of The Marine Girls, yet she has deliberately not included any tracks from her time with these bands on Solo: Songs and Collaborations 1982 - 2015 saying "‘This album deliberately isn’t called ‘The Best of Tracey Thorn,’ says Tracey of the collection. ‘Many might think my best work was with Everything But The Girl, or the Marine Girls, or that I should at least include some of those tracks. But with any interesting compilation you have to have a story to tell, a unifying theme, and here the idea is contained in the single word of the title, Solo."

Reception
Tracey Thorn did various interviews in the weeks leading up to the release, including an interview with HMV in which she said "that the advent of online connection with people who like your music is quite empowering. I have more direct access to the people out there who are interested in my music than I used to have". The album was also reviewed in The Irish Times.

Solo: Songs and Collaborations 1982–2015 entered the Official UK Albums Chart at number 53 on 30 October.

Track listing

One-disc edition

References

External links
 

2015 compilation albums
Tracey Thorn albums